The 1950 Monte Carlo Rally was the 20th Rallye Automobile de Monte-Carlo. It was won by Marcel Becquart.

Entry list

Results

References

External links 

Monte Carlo Rally
Monte Carlo Rally
Monte Carlo Rally
Monte Carlo Rally